Paul Head (born July 1, 1965 in Forest Gate, Greater London) is a male retired male hammer thrower from England.

Athletics career
Head competed for Great Britain at the 1992 Summer Olympics in Barcelona, Spain. A member of the Newham & Essex Beagles Athletic Club he set his personal best (74.02 metres) in 1990.

He competed in four successive Commonwealth Games; he represented England, at the 1990 Commonwealth Games in Auckland, New Zealand before winning a silver medal when representing England, at the 1994 Commonwealth Games in Victoria, British Columbia, Canada. He represented England for the third time, at the 1998 Commonwealth Games in Kuala Lumpur, Malaysia and then won a bronze medal at the 2002 Commonwealth Games in Manchester.

Achievements

References

 
 sports-reference
 Profile

1965 births
Living people
British male hammer throwers
Athletes (track and field) at the 1992 Summer Olympics
Athletes (track and field) at the 1990 Commonwealth Games
Athletes (track and field) at the 1994 Commonwealth Games
Athletes (track and field) at the 1998 Commonwealth Games
Athletes (track and field) at the 2002 Commonwealth Games
Commonwealth Games silver medallists for England
Commonwealth Games bronze medallists for England
Olympic athletes of Great Britain
People from Forest Gate
Commonwealth Games medallists in athletics
World Athletics Championships athletes for Great Britain
Medallists at the 1994 Commonwealth Games
Medallists at the 2002 Commonwealth Games